The 1996 Men's Junior European Volleyball Championship was the 15th edition of the Men's Junior European Volleyball Championship, organised by Europe's governing volleyball body, the CEV. It was held in Netanya and Ranana in Israel from August 28 to September 5, 1996.

Poland won their first title in the tournament by defeating Italy.

Preliminary round
All times are Israel Summer Time (UTC+03:00)

Pool I

Pool II

Final round
All times are Israel Summer Time (UTC+03:00)

9th–12th semifinals

11th place match

9th place match

5th–8th semifinals

7th place match

5th place match

Final

Semifinals

3rd place match

Final

Final standing

References

External links
 Confédération Européenne de Volleyball

Men's Junior European Volleyball Championship
European Championship
1996 in Israeli sport
International volleyball competitions hosted by Israel
1996 in youth sport